Atikovo (Ätäk) is a rural locality (a village) and the administrative centre of Atikovsky Selsoviet, Burzyansky District, Bashkortostan, Russia. The population was 455 as of 2010. There are 4 streets.

Geography 
Atikovo is located 24 km southwest of Starosubkhangulovo (the district's administrative centre) by road. Mindigulovo is the nearest rural locality.

References 

Rural localities in Burzyansky District